The medial pterygoid nerve (or internal pterygoid nerve) is a nerve of the head. It is a branch of the mandibular nerve (CN V3). It supplies the medial pterygoid muscle, the tensor veli palatini muscle, and the tensor tympani muscle.

Structure 
The medial pterygoid nerve is a slender branch of the mandibular nerve (CN V3), itself a branch of the trigeminal nerve (CN V). It is the first branch of the mandibular nerve. It enters the deep surface of the medial pterygoid muscle. It passes through the otic ganglion without synapsing, so is neurologically distinct. However, it provides physical support. The medial pterygoid nerve receives some motor fibres from the otic ganglion.

Function 
The medial pterygoid nerve supplies the medial pterygoid muscle. It also supplies tensor veli palatini muscle, through the nerve to tensor veli palatini, one of its branches. Of the five paired skeletal muscles to the soft palate, tensor veli palati muscle is the only muscle not innervated by the pharyngeal plexus. It also supplies the tensor tympani muscle in the middle ear.

References 

Mandibular nerve